Amalia de Jesus Flagelado (Riós, Spain, July 22, 1901 – Taubaté, state of São Paulo, Brazil, April 18, 1977), born Amalia Aguirre, was a Catholic religious sister and mystic. She was co-founder of the Congregation of the Missionary Sisters of Jesus Crucified, best known for receiving, in the 1930s, the apparitions of Our Lady of Tears in Campinas, Brazil. "Flagelado", in Portuguese, means flagellated. Among the miraculous events surrounding her life are, among others, visions and stigmata. She is venerated as a Servant of God by the Catholic Church.

Life 
Amalia Aguirre was born in 1901 in Ríos (Galicia). Her parents were immigrants to Brazil, However, Amalia, who was pious and devoted to works of charity, stayed in Spain and cared for sufferers of the Great Flu pandemic. In summer 1919, she followed her parents to Brazil. In 1928, she co-founded, with Bishop Francisco de Barreto, a religious congregation in Campinas (Sao Paulo), which was called the Missionaries of Crucified Jesus and took the religious name Amalia de Jesus Flagelado (the Portugese flagelado in refers to Jesus Christ's torture at the pillar). She lived in the monastery of Campinas until 1953, when she was sent to the House of Our Lady of the Apparition in Taubaté (Sao Paulo), where she died in 1977.

Ecclesiastical approval 
On March 8, 1932, the Bishop of Campinas recognized the veracity of the apparitions of Our Lady to Sister Amalia and granted  the imprimatur for the publication of sister Amalia's writings (which included the messages of Jesus and the Virgin Mary) and the prayers of the Crown of Our Lady of Tears. On February 20, 1934, bishop Francisco published an episcopal letter and reinforced the importance of devotion to Our Lady of Tears.

Bibliography 
In Portuguese.
 Devocionário de Nossa Senhora das Lagrimas. Santuário, 2021. ISBN 6555271361
 Irmã Amália e a devoção a Nossa Senhora das Lágrimas. Imaculada, 2022. ISBN 6587985580

References 

Servants of God
Brazilian Servants of God

1901 births
1977 deaths